Manchester station is a busway station located in Los Angeles, California. It is situated between the Slauson and Harbor Freeway stations on the J Line, a bus rapid transit route which runs between El Monte, Downtown Los Angeles and San Pedro as part of the Los Angeles Metro Busway system. The station consists of two side platforms in the center of Interstate 110 above Manchester Avenue. The station serves the Vermont Knolls, Vermont Vista, Florence, and Broadway-Manchester neighborhoods of Los Angeles.

Manchester station was built between 1989 and 1996 as part of the Harbor Transitway and opened to passengers on August 1, 1996. J Line buses serve the station twenty-four hours a day; the headway between buses is about four minutes during peak periods, with less frequent service at other times. Manchester station is also served by several Los Angeles Metro Bus, OC Bus (Orange County), and Torrance Transit bus services, most of which only run during weekday peak periods.

Station layout
Manchester station is situated along the Harbor Transitway and consists of two side platforms in the median of the Interstate 110 (Harbor Freeway). The station is located near the Vermont Knolls, Vermont Vista, Florence and Broadway-Manchester neighborhoods of Los Angeles.

The busway platforms are accessed from two ground-level plazas on the north and south sides of East Manchester Avenue between South Figueroa Street and South Broadway or a pedestrian bridge from the east park and ride lot. The ground-level plazas each have a Transit Access Pass (TAP) ticket vending machine that was added in early 2017 to support all-door boarding on the J Line. The station has 247 park and ride spaces in two parking lots built into the "leaves" of the partial cloverleaf interchange between Manchester Avenue and Interstate 110.

Services

Manchester station is used by the Metro J Line bus rapid transit route which runs between the El Monte Station in El Monte, Downtown Los Angeles and the Harbor Gateway Transit Center in Gardena, California, with select trips continuing onto San Pedro. The J Line is part of the Los Angeles Metro Busway system.

In addition to J Line buses, the busway platforms at Manchester station are also served by the all-day Los Angeles Metro Bus route  to Disneyland. There are also several routes that use the busway, geared towards people commuting to Los Angeles, operating only during weekday rush-hours, operating towards the city in the morning and returning at night: LA Metro Bus route  to San Pedro; and Torrance Transit route 4X to Torrance (also operates all-day Saturday). The station is also served by the Dodger Stadium Express shuttle that operates during home games during baseball season.

Manchester station is also served by several bus routes that use bus stops near to the station on surface streets: LA Metro Bus route  that runs between Lincoln Heights and Rosewood via Broadway,  that runs between Eagle Rock and South Los Angeles via Figueroa, and  that runs between Playa del Rey and Norwalk via Manchester.

References

Los Angeles Metro Busway stations
South Los Angeles
J Line (Los Angeles Metro)
Transport infrastructure completed in 1996
1996 establishments in California
Bus stations in Los Angeles